
Gmina Bolesławiec is a rural gmina (administrative district) in Bolesławiec County, Lower Silesian Voivodeship, in south-western Poland. Its seat is the town of Bolesławiec, although the town is not part of the territory of the gmina.

Neighbouring gminas
Gmina Bolesławiec is bordered by the town of Bolesławiec and the gminas of Gromadka, Lwówek Śląski, Nowogrodziec, Osiecznica, Szprotawa and Warta Bolesławiecka.

Villages
The gmina contains the villages of Bolesławice, Bożejowice, Brzeźnik, Chościszowice, Dąbrowa Bolesławiecka, Dobra, Golnice, Kozłów, Kraśnik Dolny, Kraśnik Górny, Kraszowice, Krępnica, Kruszyn, Łąka, Łaziska, Lipiany, Mierzwin, Nowa, Nowa Wieś, Nowe Jaroszowice, Ocice, Otok, Parkoszów, Rakowice, Stara Oleszna, Stare Jaroszowice, Suszki, Trzebień, Trzebień Mały, and Żeliszów.

References

Boleslawiec
Bolesławiec County